Ramon Marcelino Diaz Abaya (born November 6, 1979), known professionally as Marc Abaya, is a Filipino actor, singer, TV host, and VJ. He appeared in the 2009 Philippine release of Tinker Bell.

He is the son of actor/director Manolo Abaya and director Marilou Diaz-Abaya.

Musical career
Abaya was discovered by Raimund Marasigan of Eraserheads during a "battle of bands" in which Abaya's band Shirley Beans won first place. Marasigan, who was one of the judges for the night, invited Abaya to act as frontman for the band Sandwich in 1998. While Abaya was a member of the band, they released three albums: Grip, Stand, Throw; 4-track mind; and Thanks to the Moon's Gravitational Pull.

While in Sandwich, Abaya formed the band Kjwan with his closest friends in May 2003. In 2004, Kjwan released their self-titled album, which included the carrier single "Daliri."

Abaya joined MTV Philippines in 2003 and became one of the VJs until the dissolution of the channel under Music Source, Inc. on January 1, 2007. Abaya hosted a variety of shows, including Rockola on MTV and Massive. In September 2009, AYC hired him to man MTV Philippines' music station U92 (now Radyo5 92.3 News FM) for a weekly show.

In 2013, he collaborated with Gloc-9 on the song "Tsinelas sa Putikan", for the album Liham at Lihim under Universal Records.

Acting career
Abaya played the role of Francis in an ABS-CBN afternoon drama series, Ligaw na Bulaklak. He was also one of the judges of the network's reality entertainment show Showtime and host of Pilipinas Got More Talent, a spin-off program of the show Pilipinas Got Talent.

In 2010, Abaya joined the cast of Dagim, a Cinema One Original film directed by Joaquin Pedro Valdes for which he won "Best Supporting Actor" at the Cinema One Originals Awards.

In 2011, Abaya moved to GMA Network for the shows Party Pilipinas and I Heart You, Pare!

In 2012, he was seen in the GMA Afternoon Drama show Faithfully.

In 2019, After almost 9 years, he returned to his home network ABS-CBN via FPJ's Ang Probinsyano.

Discography

With Kjwan
Studio Albums

Other Appearances

Filmography

Film

Television

References

External links

1979 births
Living people
Tagalog people
21st-century Filipino male singers
Filipino male television actors
VJs (media personalities)
GMA Network personalities
Star Magic personalities
ABS-CBN personalities